Timothy Larsen (born 4 September 1967) is an historian and the Carolyn and Fred McManis Chair of Christian Thought at Wheaton College. Larsen completed a bachelor's and master's degree at Wheaton College and obtained a doctorate in history at the University of Stirling. He is a fellow of the Royal Historical Society.

References

Historians of Christianity
Living people
Alumni of the University of Stirling
Wheaton College (Illinois) alumni
Wheaton College (Illinois) faculty
American historians of religion
1967 births
Fellows of the Royal Historical Society